Alderholt  is a large village and civil parish in east Dorset, England; situated  west of Fordingbridge. The parish includes the hamlets of Crendell and Cripplestyle. The main road running through the village is the B3078 connecting Alderholt to Fordingbridge and Shaftesbury. The village has a population of 3,113 according to the 2001 Census, increasing along with the electoral ward of the same name to 3,171 at the 2011 Census.

The village is served by a small Co-operative store, (previously a Spar, until early 2007), veterinary clinic and part-time GP surgery. The village pub is The Churchill Arms. There are three churches in the village: Alderholt Chapel, St James' Church of England, and the Tabernacle Gospel Church. Until mid-2014, Alderholt also had its own independent pet store.

The village also has a large recreation ground with a sports and social club, two tennis courts, and a children's play area.

Until 1964, the village was served by a railway station named Daggons Road, situated to the west of the village, and on a line connecting to Fordingbridge and Salisbury to the north, and Verwood and Wimborne to the south.

The civil parish was created in 1894. A Parish Book was published in 1994 by the Alderholt Parish Council, recording Parish details and interest over the 100 years.

Alderholt is home to the ReCreate Arts Festival each April and has hosted such acts as Dodgy, Andy Kind and S Club.

References

External links

 Alderholt Parish Council website
 Census data
 St James' First School
 The Parish Church of St James
 Alderholt Chapel

Civil parishes in Dorset
Villages in Dorset